Tio vackra visor och Personliga Person (English: Ten Beautiful Songs and Personal Person) is the fourth studio album by the Swedish-Dutch folk singer-songwriter Cornelis Vreeswijk. The album contains some of Vreeswijk's famous songs, such as "Somliga går med trasiga skor", "Felicia - adjö" and "Deirdres samba".

Track listing
Music and lyrics by Cornelis Vreeswijk unless otherwise noted.
Songs have links to their lyrics on external site 

 Deirdres samba (Chico Buarque de Hollanda/Cornelis Vreeswijk) - 3:07
 Bibbis visa - 1:29
 Veronica - 3:09
 I Rio de Janeiro (Carl-Axel Dominique/Cornelis Vreeswijk) - 3:45
 Florentijn i byn - 2:36
 Papillas samba - 1:49
 Somliga går med trasiga skor - 3:07
 Felicia - adjö - 2:42
 Tomtebloss - 1:53
 Saskia - 4:38
 Personliga Person - 1:54

Personnel 
Cornelis Vreeswijk - vocals, guitar
Rune Gustafsson - guitar
Sture Nordin - bass
Sabu Martinez - conga, maracas
Yngve Sandström - flute

References

Cornelis Vreeswijk albums
1968 albums
Swedish-language albums